Wojciech Łobodziński (born 20 October 1982) is a Polish football manager and a former player who played as a midfielder.

Club career
Łobodziński started playing football with Zawisza Bydgoszcz. In 1999, he joined Stomil Olsztyn where he made a debut in the Ekstraklasa. Subsequently, Łobodziński moved to Wisła Płock where he played until 2003. Then he played for Zagłębie Lubin and helped the team win Ekstraklasa championship in 2006–07 season. In 2008 Łobodziński moved to Wisła Kraków where he played until 2011, winning the Ekstraklasa title three times. In 2012, he joined another Ekstraklasa outfit, ŁKS Łódź.

International career
He was part of the Polish U-16 team that placed second at the UEFA U-16 Championship in 1999 as well as the U-18 team that won the UEFA U-18 Championship in 2001. On 6 December 2006, he made his debut for the senior side of his country in the 5–2 victory against United Arab Emirates in a friendly match. Łobodziński was selected for the Polish Euro 2008 squad, appearing in all three group stage matches in an eventual group stage exit.

Retirement and coaching career
On 11 January 2019 it was announced, that Łobodziński would retire from professional football and instead continue playing for the reserve team of Miedź Legnica where he also was supposed to function as the assistant manager.

Honours

Player
Zagłębie Lubin
 Ekstraklasa: 2006–07
 Polish Super Cup: 2007

Wisła Kraków
 Ekstraklasa: 2007–08, 2008–09, 2010–11

International
 UEFA U-18 Championship: 2001

Manager
Miedź Legnica
I liga: 2021–22

Career statistics

Club

International

International Goals

References

External links
 Player profile on FIFA.com
 Player profile on uefa.com
 
 

1982 births
Living people
Association football midfielders
Polish footballers
Poland youth international footballers
Poland under-21 international footballers
Poland international footballers
Zawisza Bydgoszcz players
OKS Stomil Olsztyn players
Wisła Płock players
Zagłębie Lubin players
Wisła Kraków players
ŁKS Łódź players
Miedź Legnica players
Sportspeople from Bydgoszcz
UEFA Euro 2008 players
Ekstraklasa players
I liga players
II liga players
III liga players
Polish football managers
I liga managers
Ekstraklasa managers